Lincoln Street Elementary School may refer to the following schools:

A school in the Hillsboro School District in Hillsboro, Oregon
A school in the Waverly Central School District in Waverly, New York
A school in Northborough, Massachusetts